Erysimum nevadense is a perennial short-lived herb endemic to the Sierra Nevada of Spain, although there are some citations in the nearby Sierra de Gádor (Almería). This wallflower occurs between 1,700 and 2,700 m above sea level in subalpine scrublands and alpine meadows. It may be treated as a narrowly circumscribed single species, one of a group or complex of six separate species, or as a more broadly circumscribed species with six subspecies.

Description
It is well supplied with hairs, most of which are boat-shaped (navicular), although some are three-rayed.

Taxonomy
Erysimum nevadense was first described by Georges François Reuter in 1855. In 1979, Adolf Polatschek described a number of new species of Erysimum. Six of these were considered to be closely related to E. nevadense, and in 1990, Peter William  Ball explained the decision made in Flora Europaea to reduce the six to subspecies of E. nevadense. They were treated as separate species making up the nevadense group or complex in Flora Iberica in 1993. A molecular phylogenetic study published in 2014 included four of the species, E. gomez-campoi, E. mediohispanicum, E. nevadense and E. rondae. The study did not support the view that the four were closely related. In the combined mitochondrial and nuclear DNA analysis, E. mediohispanicum and E. nevadense fell into one clade, E. rondae into another, while E. gomez-campoi was sister to both clades. The authors concluded that the E. nevadense group did not have phylogenetic support.

Subspecies
Plants of the World Online divides Erysimum nevadense into six subspecies, which Flora Iberica treats as separate species.
Erysimum nevadense subsp. fitzii (Polatschek) P.W.Ball = Erysimum fitzii Polatschek
Erysimum nevadense subsp. gomez-campoi (Polatschek) P.W.Ball = Erysimum gomez-campoi Polatschek
Erysimum nevadense subsp. mediohispanicum (Polatschek) P.W.Ball = Erysimum mediohispanicum Polatschek
Erysimum nevadense subsp. merxmuelleri (Polatschek) P.W.Ball = Erysimum merxmuelleri Polatschek
Erysimum nevadense subsp. nevadense = Erysimum nevadense Reut., sensu stricto
Erysimum nevadense subsp. rondae (Polatschek) P.W.Ball = Erysimum rondae Polatschek

Pollination biology

Flowers are visited by many species of insects belonging to the order Hymenoptera, Diptera, Coleoptera, Lepidoptera and Heteroptera. Most abundant flower visitors are Proformica longiseta (Formicidae), an ant species endemic to the Sierra Nevada and surrounding mountain ranges, Dasytes subaeneus (Melyridae), Malachius laticollis (Malachidae) and some species of beeflies belonging to the genus Bombylius and Parageron (Bombyliidae).

References

External links
evoflor a web page on Erysimum floral evolution
Flora of Almería

nevadense
Endemic flora of Spain
Perennial plants
Plants described in 1855